General Seong Seung ( ? - 1456) was a Korean Joseon Dynasty politician and soldier. His pen name was Jukgok, father of Seong Sam-mun.

See also 
 Sejo of Joseon
 Sayukshin
 Saengyukshin
 Seong Sam-mun

References

External links 
 Seong Seung 
 Seong Seung 
 Seong Seung  
 Seong Seung 

1456 deaths
Year of birth missing
People from Hongseong County
Joseon scholar-officials
15th-century Korean writers